Abed Bwanika (born 1 August 1967) is a Ugandan veterinarian, politician, and pastor. He is the President of the People's Development Party, an opposition political party in Uganda.

Background and education
Bwanika was born on 1 August 1967 in modern-day Lwengo District. He attended Kimwanyu Primary School, near his parents' home in said area. Later, he studied at Masaka Secondary School for his 'O' level, and at Kigezi High School for his 'A' level. He was admitted to Makerere University, where he graduated with a Bachelor of Veterinary Medicine degree. Later, he earned a Master of Science degree in the same field, also from Makerere.

Career
Following his first degree, he stayed on at Makerere as a graduate tutor, while he conducted research and pursued a second degree. In 2001, he left teaching and a private veterinary consultancy. He also opened a church, Christian Witness Church.

During the 1996 presidential elections, he supported Yoweri Museveni but switched allegiance to Kizza Besigye in 2001. He ran as an independent candidate in the February 2006 presidential election, where he finished in fourth place, with 0.95 percent of the vote (65,874 total votes).

He again contested the February 2011 presidential elections as the candidate of the People's Development Party, which he founded; he is also the party's president. The second-time around, he received about 14,000 fewer votes (51,708 total votes), garnering 0.65 percent of the popular vote.

In August 2020 he left the People's Development Party to join the National Unity Platform. In the 2021 general election he was elected to Parliament to represent the Kimanya-Kabonera constituency in Masaka City.

Personal life
Bwanika is married to Gladys Namusuwe, a fish biologist and lecturer in the Department of Zoology at Makerere University. They have been married since 1995 and are the parents of four sons: Wise, Decent, Chosen, and Delight.

References

1967 births
Ganda people
Living people
Makerere University alumni
People from Lwengo District
Ugandan veterinarians
Academic staff of Makerere University
People from Central Region, Uganda
Members of the Parliament of Uganda
21st-century Ugandan politicians